Samoana oreas, common name the "Polynesian tree snail", is a species of tropical, air-breathing land snail, a terrestrial, pulmonate, gastropod mollusc in the family Partulidae. This species is endemic to Ra'ivāvae, Austral Islands, French Polynesia.

References

Fauna of French Polynesia
Samoana
Gastropods described in 1953
Taxobox binomials not recognized by IUCN